Aksentyevo is a rural locality (a village) in Kisnemskoye Rural Settlement, Vashkinsky District, Vologda Oblast, Russia. The population was 14 as of 2002.

Geography 
Aksentyevo is located 23 km northwest of Lipin Bor (the district's administrative centre) by road. Troitskoye is the nearest rural locality.

References 

Rural localities in Vashkinsky District